Parliamentary elections were held in Nauru on April 26, 2008, following the dissolving of Parliament by President Marcus Stephen on April 18. The decision came after what Stephen referred to as "months of political deadlock". Of the parliament's eighteen members, nine supported the Stephen government and nine were in opposition.

Events leading to election

The deadlock had been exacerbated by a crisis between the President and the Speaker of Parliament, Opposition member David Adeang. On March 22, Adeang had called a Parliamentary session, allegedly without informing government ministers, who therefore did not attend. Opposition MPs, Adeang included, constituted a majority of legislators present, and passed a ruling outlawing dual citizenship for Members of Parliament. The ruling, if applied, would have affected senior Cabinet ministers Dr. Kieren Keke and Frederick Pitcher. Had they been compelled to resign from Parliament, the Opposition would have controlled a majority of seats in Parliament. The law was overturned as unconstitutional by the Supreme Court, and Adeang subsequently sought to suspend all pro-government MPs from Parliament, citing their allegedly "unruly behaviour". A week later, Stephen dissolved Parliament.

Two observers from the Pacific Islands Forum were present to monitor the election, at the request of the Nauruan government.

There were 65 candidates for the 18 seats, among whom were former Presidents Ludwig Scotty and René Harris.

Results
All nine supporters of Stephen (Stephen himself, Kieren Keke, Mathew Batsiua, Roland Kun, Frederick Pitcher, Sprent Dabwido, former Speaker Riddell Akua, Dominic Tabuna and Rykers Solomon) were reelected, while three opposition MPs (former President René Harris, Cyril Buraman and Fabian Ribauw) lost their seats; the government claims it has thus won the election. Indeed, all three newly elected MPs joined the government and thereby ended the legislative deadlock. The new parliament was expected to hold its first session on 29 April 2008.

References

nauru
Parliamentary election
Elections in Nauru
Non-partisan elections
Election and referendum articles with incomplete results